Miss America 1933 - the eighth Miss America pageant was revived after a six year hiatus. It was the middle of the Great Depression and Armand Nichols attempted to organize it with the support of the Mayor and City Council, but without support from either the Atlantic City Chamber of Commerce or the Hotelsmens Association,.

While the contestants of the pageants of the 1920s represented cities, usually sponsored by local newspapers, 1933 marked the change to state queens with little newspaper sponsorship. The lack of organizational infrastructure together with the decline of (free) newspaper support and advertising resulted in state qualifying contests that varied widely - from multi-day multi-city contests involving thousands, to a simple selection from a photo array.

The 1933 pageant, a five-day extravaganza on Tuesday-Saturday, September 5-9, 1933, was the first to be held at the Convention Hall (later renamed the Boardwalk Hall). Promised grand prizes (including a RKO screen test, theatrical contracts, Ford automobile, diamond wrist watch and a trip to Bermuda) enticed 31 contestants from 30 states nationwide, far fewer than the 48 state contestants originally planned.

Marian Bergeron, Miss Connecticut, was chosen Miss America but there was so much confusion during and after the vote tabulations that nobody informed Marian she had won. She was unaware of her victory until the dressing assistants placed the banner on her. At age 15 she is the youngest winner in the history of the Miss America Pageant.

The pageant was a public relations nightmare, financially unsuccessful, with a "Keystone Kops series of mishaps" including a stolen crown. Two contestants withdrew, four were disqualified, four were underage, and 18 states sent no contestant.  Amid the contention and bickering there were allegations the contest was not on the "up and up" and judge Russell Patterson alleged undue influence, stating that Atlantic County treasurer and political boss Nucky Johnson tried to pressure the judges to choose his favorite. The pageant went on hiatus again the following year but was revived permanently in 1935 with new organization.

Results

Other awards - September 6: Most Beautiful Girl in an Evening Gown Competition

Contestants

References

Secondary sources

External links

 Miss America official website

1933
1933 in the United States
1933 in New Jersey
September 1933 events
Events in Atlantic City, New Jersey